In Māori tradition of New Zealand, Tama-te-kapua, also spelt Tamatekapua and  Tama-te-Kapua and also known as Tama, was the captain of the Arawa canoe which came to New Zealand from Polynesia in about 1350.

The reason for his leaving his homeland was that he and his brother Whakaturia had stolen breadfruit (kuru or poroporo) from a tree belonging to a chief named Uenuku. They had stolen the fruit in revenge for the theft and consumption of a dog belonging to Haumai-tāwhiti by Toi-te-huatahi and Uenuku. The two brothers fled after tribal war broke out because of the incident. Tama Te Kapua also took two women who were the wives of other men with him, one of whom was Whakaotirangi. The other was the wife of Ruao. Tama-te-kapua asked Ruao to fetch an axe left by his house, and while he was ashore, Tama-te-kapua raised the anchor and left Ruao behind.

Some legends describe Tama-te-kapua asking Ngātoro-i-rangi, tohunga and navigator of the Tainui waka, to come aboard the Arawa with his wife to bless the vessel. Once they boarded, Tama-te-kapua set sail and kidnapped the pair.

Several other canoes fled at the same time, including the Tainui and Matatūa. When the Arawa landed at Whangaparaoa, in the North Island, Tama found that the  Tainui had arrived before them and claimed possession of the land, but through strategic cunning, Tama managed to disprove their claim. The Arawa then went on to Maketu,  where Tama-te-kapua settled. His descendants peopled this part and the Rotorua region. Today their descendants say of the Arawa canoe that the bow piece is Maketu and the stern-piece is Mount Tongariro.

Tama-te-kapua was said to be very tall –  – and the son of Haumai-tāwhiti (also spelt Houmai Tawhiti) of Hawaiki, the ancestral home of the Polynesian people. Tama-te-kapua had two sons, Tuhoro and Kahu-mata-momoe. He was buried at the top of Mount Moehau (on Cape Colville, the northernmost tip of Coromandel Peninsula). Kahu-mata-momoe placing a mauri stone on Boat Rock is associated with the naming of the Waitematā Harbour in Auckland.

The meeting house at Te Papaiouru Marae is named after Tamatekapua.

References

Māori mythology
Arawa (canoe)
Legendary Polynesian people
Polynesian navigators